HMS Legion  was a  built for the Royal Navy during the 1910s.

Description
The Laforey class were improved and faster versions of the preceding . They displaced . Legion was powered by two Parsons direct-drive steam turbines, each driving one propeller shaft, using steam provided by four Yarrow boilers. The ships' complement was 74 officers and ratings.

The ships were armed with three single QF  Mark IV guns and two QF 1.5-pounder (37 mm) anti-aircraft guns. These latter guns were later replaced by a pair of QF 2-pounder (40 mm) "pom-pom" anti-aircraft guns. The ships were also fitted with two above-water twin mounts for  torpedoes. They were equipped with rails to carry four Vickers Elia Mk IV mines, although these rails were never used.

Construction and service
Legion was constructed by William Denny and Brothers. She was laid down on 19 September 1912, launched on 3 February 1914 and was completed in July 1914, joining the 3rd Destroyer Flotilla,  based at The Nore following commissioning on 15 July.

She was attached to the Harwich Force and served in the North Sea. The ship saw action in several engagements, including the Battle off Texel. Legion was severely damaged by a German mine on 10 November 1916. It was decided to convert Legion to allow use for minelaying while under repair. Rails were fitted to allow the carrying of up to 40 mines.

Notes

Bibliography
 
 
 
 
 
 

 

Laforey-class destroyers (1913)
1914 ships
World War I destroyers of the United Kingdom
Ships built on the River Clyde